Połomia  is a village in the administrative district of Gmina Mszana, within Wodzisław County, Silesian Voivodeship, in southern Poland.

The village has a population of 2,300.

References

Villages in Wodzisław County